William Hosier was the member of Parliament for Great Grimsby in 1404. He and his sons twice attempted to murder the Grimsby burgess William Welle, but succeeded only in wounding him.

References 

Year of birth unknown
Year of death unknown
English merchants
English MPs October 1404
Members of the Parliament of England for Great Grimsby